Chen Ke (born 16 May 1979) is a Chinese basketball player who competed in the 2004 Summer Olympics.

References

1979 births
Living people
Basketball players from Beijing
Bayi Rockets players
Chinese men's basketball players
Olympic basketball players of China
Basketball players at the 2004 Summer Olympics
Asian Games medalists in basketball
Asian Games silver medalists for China
Basketball players at the 2002 Asian Games
Medalists at the 2002 Asian Games
2002 FIBA World Championship players